The Mihranids were an Iranian family which ruled several regions of Caucasus from 330 to 821. They claimed to be of Sasanian Persian descent but were of Parthian origin.

History 
The dynasty was founded when a certain Mihran, a distant relative of Sasanian, settled in the region of Gardman in Utik. He was probably a member of a branch of the Mihranid family which was listed among the Seven Great Houses of Iran, and whose two other lines ruled Iberia (Chosroid Dynasty) and Gogarene/Gugark. 

It is uncertain how the Mihranids became Arranshahs (princes of Albania). Their ancestor, Mihran, was said to have received the region of Gardman by the Sasanian monarch Khosrow II. In , the Mihranids who exterminated all of the members of the Aranshahik dynasty with the exception of a certain Zarmihr, who was related to the Mihranids through marriage. This was due to the Aranshahiks still having some authority in Albania, which they had originally ruled until their overthrow in the 1st-century. The Mihranids then conquered all of Albania and assumed the title of Arranshah, but without embracing its royal status. The head of the family's full titulature was thus "Lord of Gardman and Prince of Albania".

The most prominent representatives of the family in the 7th century were Varaz Grigor, his son Javanshir, and Varaz-Tiridates I. Mihranids assumed a Persian title of Arranshahs (i.e. shahs of Arran, Persian name of Albania). The family's rule came to an end after the assassination of Varaz-Tiridates II by Nerseh Pilippean in 822–23.

Subsequently Sahl Smbatean, a descendant of the aforementioned Arranshahik (Eṙanšahik) family, assumed the title of Arranshah and ruled significant part of Caucasian Albania.

Mihranids of Gogarene

 Peroz (330–361)
 Unknown (361–394)
 Bakur I (394–400)
 Arshusha I (400–430)
 Bakur II (430–455)
 Arshusha II (455–470)
 Varsken (470–482)
 Arshusha III (482–540)
 Arshusha IV (540–608)
 Vahram-Arshusha V (608–627)
 Arshusha VI (???–748)

Mihranids of Gardman
 Peroz (330–361)
 Khurs (361–430)
 Barzabod (430–440)
 Varaz-Bakur (440–450)
 Mihr (450–480)
 Armayel (480–510)
 Vard I (510–540)
 Vardan I (540–570)
 Vard II (570–600)

Mihranids of Caucasian Albania
 Varaz Grigor (628–636)
 Javanshir (636–680)
 Varaz-Tiridates I (680–705)
 Shiruye (699–704, usurper)
 Vardan II (705–740)
 Narseh-Dzndak (740–770)
 Gagikh II (770–790)
 Stephanos I (790–821)
 Varaz-Tiridates II (821–822)

References

Sources 
 
 
 
 
 
 
 
 
 
 
 
 
 
 
 
 
 

 
Medieval history of the Caucasus
4th century in Iran
Ancient history of the Caucasus